Karen Nutarak is a Canadian Inuk politician, who was elected to the Legislative Assembly of Nunavut in the 2021 Nunavut general election. She represents the electoral district of Tununiq.

References

Living people
Members of the Legislative Assembly of Nunavut
Women MLAs in Nunavut
Inuit politicians
21st-century Canadian politicians
21st-century Canadian women politicians
Inuit from Nunavut
People from Pond Inlet
Year of birth missing (living people)